DongWoo Animation Co. Ltd (also known as DongWoo A&E Co. Ltd) is an animation studio located in Seoul, South Korea. It has produced many animated series and films created and produced in the United States, Canada, South Korea and Japan. The current CEO of the studio is Kim Young-doo.

History
The company was established in March 1991 as DongWoo Animation.

In 1994, it had become first priority work-for-hire studio for Studio Gallop.

In 1998, it began to work directly with Sony Columbia TriStar (USA) and since 2002 has been a main source of overseas animation production for Warner Bros. Animation.

In April 1999, the company was renamed to DongWoo Animation Corporation (Dongwoo A&E Corporation) (동우애니메이션 & 엔터테인먼트).

BASToF Lemon, the company's first original animation series, began its broadcast in 2001.

In January 2002, Dongwoo opened its Los Angeles Office.

In April 2004, Dongwoo opened its Gangwon office.

In April 2012, DongWoo Animation & Entertainment was renamed to Dongwoo A&E Co., Ltd (동우에이앤이㈜).

Animation

Original series
A Fairy Tale Christmas (2005)
Africa a.F.r.I.c.A
Animated Classic Fairy Tales (2003)
BASToF Lemon
Bee and PuppyCat (2014)
Bristol Expedition (2008)
 (2007)
Dokdo (2007)
Dooly the Little Dinosaur (2009)
Gotya!
Jubles
KARA The Animation 
Kommi (2004)
Magi-Nation
MANI's adventure (2011)
Mateo
Mudaeri (2007)
 (2010)
Naughty Keratops Coryillo 
Power King Match-Up Keeper 
Sinarak (2005)
Uniminipet
Vary Peri

Co-productions
Animal Yokocho
Bristol Expedition (2008)
Chaotic (2006) (Season 2–3)
Dooly the Little Dinosaur (2013)
Je Suis to be Kidding me (2019)
KARA the Animation (2012)
Magi-Nation (2009)
Mainichi Kaasan (2011)
Origami Warriors (2006)
Olympus Guardian (TV series) (2002)
Paboo & Mojies (2012)
Pretty Rhythm: Aurora Dream/PrismStone (2013)
Pripara
Racing Force (2015–2018)
Racing Force The Beginning (2018–present)
Scan2Go (2010)
Soul Knights (2017–2018)
Tama and Friends: Search for it! The Magic Puni-Puni Stone (2006)
Tank Knights Portriss (2006)
Teenage Mutant Ninja Turtles (2003)
What About Mimi? (2002)
Yvon of the Yukon (2002)
Zoobles! (2006)

Foreign productions
A Little Dinosour Doolie (2009)
Aloha, Scooby-Doo! (2005)
Akazukin Cha Cha (1994-1995)
Avengers Assemble (2013)
Baby Looney Tunes (2002-2004)
Batman: Gotham Knight (Deadshot , co-produced with Madhouse)
Batman: The Brave and the Bold (2008)
Bee and Puppycat (2014)
Ben 10 (2005–2008)
Ben 10: Alien Force (2008–2010)
Ben 10: Ultimate Alien (2010–2012)
Ben 10: Omniverse (2012–2014)
Big Guy and Rusty the Boy Robot (1999-2001)
Black Dynamite (2012)
Blood of Zeus (2020) (alongside Powerhouse Animation Studios)
Bravest Warriors (2012-2017)
 ChaeChaepong Kimchipong (2003)
Chaotic: M'arrillian Invasion (2009)
Chaotic: Secrets of the Lost City (2009)
Dante's Inferno: An Animated Epic (Gluttony, Greed)
 (2008)
Dawn of the Croods (2015)
Dead Space 2 DVD (pre-pro to main pro)
 Dragon League
Dragon Tales (1999)
 Eun-bi and Ka-bi's Funny Fable
Eyeshield 21 (2005–2008)
Forza! Hidemaru (2002)
Gearheadz (2007)
Generator Rex (2010)
Genji Tsuushin Agedama
Geronimo Stilton
Godzilla: The Series (1998)
Guardians of the Galaxy
He-Man and the Masters of the Universe
Hime-chan's Ribbon (1992-1993)
Hulk and the Agents of S.M.A.S.H.
Initial D: First Stage (1998)
Jackie Chan Adventures
Justice League
Justice League Unlimited
Justice League: The New Frontier
Kiteretsu Daihyakka (1994–1996)
Kochira Katsushika-ku Kameari Kōen-mae Hashutsujo (1996–1999)
Kodomo no Omocha (1996)
Krypto the Superdog (2005)
Khuda Yana (2012)
La Corda d'Oro: Primo Passo (2007)
Legion of Super Heroes (2007)
Legendz (2004)
Loonatics Unleashed (alongside DR Movie)
Magi-Nation (2008–2009)
Men in Black: The Series (alongside Lotto Animation)
Nurse Angel Ririka SOS (1994)
Olympus Guardian
 (1991)
Oggy and the Cockroaches (2012-2013)
Ozzy & Drix
Pretty Rhythm: Aurora Dream/PrismStone (2013)
Pretty Rhythm: Dear My Future
Pretty Rhythm: Rainbow Live
PriPara
Rahan: Son of the Dark Age (2008)
Rurouni Kenshin (1995)
Scooby-Doo! and the Loch Ness Monster (2004)
Scooby-Doo! Mystery Incorporated (2010)
Scooby-Doo! Pirates Ahoy!
Scooby-Doo! in Where's My Mummy? (2005)
Static Shock (2002)
Superman: Doomsday
Tama and Friends: Search for it! The Magic Puni-Puni Stone (2006)
Teen Titans
Teen Titans: Trouble In Tokyo
Teenage Mutant Ninja Turtles (2003–2010)
The Avengers: Earth's Mightiest Heroes (2010–2012) (Disney XD)
The Batman (2004–2008)
The Batman vs. Dracula
The Big Cartoonie Show
The Boondocks (2007)
The Daltons (2010)
The Haunted House (Season 2 & 4)
The Legend of Prince Valiant
The Spectacular Spider-Man Animated Series
The Super Hero Squad Show (2011)
The Zeta Project (2001)
Transformers: Car Robots (2000)
Turbo FAST
Turtles Forever
Ultimate Avengers
Ultimate Avengers 2
Ultimate Spider-Man (2012)
Ultimate Spider-Man: Web-Warriors
Underworld: Endless War
 Union King
What's New, Scooby-Doo?
W.I.T.C.H. (2nd Season)
Yu-Gi-Oh! 5D's (2008-2009)
Yu-Gi-Oh! Capsule Monsters
Yu-Gi-Oh! Duel Monsters (2003–2004)
Yu-Gi-Oh! Duel Monsters GX (2005–2008)
Yu-Gi-Oh! The Movie: Pyramid of Light
Zig & Sharko (2010–2012)

See also
Rough Draft Studios

External links 
Company Homepage: Korean English, Chinese

South Korean animation studios
Mass media companies established in 1991
Mass media in Seoul
South Korean companies established in 1991